The 5th Annual Helpmann Awards for live performance in Australia were held on 8 August 2005 at the Lyric Theatre in Sydney.

The Sapphires by Tony Briggs, produced by Melbourne Theatre Company, was named Best Play and Best New Australian Work. The Australian production of Broadway musical The Producers received five awards including Best Musical. State Opera of South Australia's season of Wagner's Ring Cycle received ten awards including Best Opera and Best Special Event.

Winners and nominees
In the following tables, winners are listed first and highlighted in boldface. The nominees are those which are listed below the winner and not in boldface.

Theatre

Musicals

Opera and Classical Music

Dance and Physical Theatre

Contemporary Music

Other

Industry

Lifetime Achievement

References

External links
The official Helpmann Awards website

Helpmann Awards
Helpmann Awards
Helpmann Awards
Helpmann Awards, 5th
Helpmann Awards